Jaroslava Lorencová is a retired Czech football goalkeeper.

She has been a member of the Czech national team. She made her debut on 31 May 2009 in a match against Poland.

Titles
 1 Czech League (2011)
 1 Czech Cup (2011)

References

1988 births
Living people
Czech women's footballers
Czech Republic women's international footballers
FC Zbrojovka Brno players
Women's association football goalkeepers
AC Sparta Praha (women) players
Czech Women's First League players